This is an alphabetical List of Native American boarding schools. For the article about the system in the United States,  see: American Indian boarding schools. For the similar system in Canada, see: Canadian Indian residential school system For other uses, see: Indian school (disambiguation).

This list is far from complete as recent reports show more than 408 American Indian Boarding Schools in the United States. Additionally, according to the Inaugural Department of the Interior Indian Boarding School report released on May 12, 2022. There were 408 schools in 37 states, and 53 unmarked/marked burial sites in the U.S. The Secretary of the Interior Deb Haaland (Laguna Pueblo)says the former United States policies were 'heartbreaking and undeniable.'<1a></See Native Viewpoint article>

 Absentee Shawnee Boarding School, near Shawnee, Indian Territory, open 1893–99
 Albuquerque Indian School, Albuquerque, New Mexico
 Anadarko Boarding School, Anadarko, Oklahoma, open 1911–33 
 Arapaho Manual Labor and Boarding School, Darlington, Indian Territory, opened in 1872 and paid for by federal funds; operated by the Hicksite (Liberal) Friends and Orthodox Quakers. Moved to Concho Indian Boarding School in 1909.
 Armstrong Academy, near Chahta Tamaha, Indian Territory
 Asbury Manual Labor School, near Fort Mitchell, Alabama, open 1822–30, and operated by the United Methodist Missions.
 Asbury Manual Labor School, near Eufaula, Creek Nation, Indian Territory, open 1850–88, by the United Methodist Missions.
 Bacone College, Muscogee, Oklahoma, 1881–present
 Bloomfield Female Academy, originally near Achille, Chickasaw Nation, Indian Territory. Opened in 1848 but relocated to Ardmore, Oklahoma around 1917; in 1934 it was renamed as Carter Seminary.
 Bond's Mission School or Montana Industrial School for Indians, run by Unitarians, Crow Indian Reservation near Custer Station, Montana, 1886–97
 Burney Institute, near Lebanon, Chickasaw Nation, Indian Territory, open 1854–87, when name changed to Chickasaw Orphan Home and Manual Labor School; it was operated by the Cumberland Presbyterian Church.
 Cameron Institute, Cameron, Choctaw Nation, Indian Territory open 1893–early 20th century, was operated by the Presbyterian Church
 Cantonment Indian Boarding School, Canton, Indian Territory, run by the General Conference Mennonites from September, 1882 to 1 July 1927.
 Carlisle Indian School, Carlisle, Pennsylvania, open 1879–1918.
 Carter Seminary, Ardmore, Oklahoma, open 1917–2004, when the facility moved to Kingston, Oklahoma. It was renamed as the Chickasaw Children's Village.
 Chamberlain Indian School, Chamberlain, South Dakota, open 1898–1909
 Chemawa Indian School, Salem, Oregon
 Cherokee Female Seminary, Tahlequah, Cherokee Nation, Indian Territory, open 1851–1910; this was established by the Cherokee Nation
 Cherokee Male Seminary, Tahlequah, Cherokee Nation, Indian Territory, open 1851–1910. First established by the Cherokee Nation.
 Cherokee Orphan Asylum, Tahlequah, Cherokee Nation, Indian Territory, opened in 1871
 Cheyenne-Arapaho Boarding School, Darlington, Indian Territory, opened 1871 became the Arapaho Manual Labor and Boarding School in 1879
 Cheyenne Manual Labor and Boarding School, Caddo Springs, Indian Territory, opened 1879 and paid with by federal funds, but run by the Hicksite (Liberal) Friends and Orthodox Quakers. Moved to Concho Indian Boarding School in 1909.
 Chickasaw (male) Academy, near Tishomingo, Chickasaw Nation, Oklahoma Opened in 1850 by the Methodist Episcopal Church and changed its name to Harley Institute around 1889.
 Chickasaw Children's Village, on Lake Texoma near Kingston, Oklahoma, opened 2004 
 Chickasaw National Academy, near Stonewall, Chickasaw Nation, Indian Territory, open about 1865 to 1880
 Chickasaw Orphan Home and Manual Labor School (formerly Burney Academy) near Lebanon, Chickasaw Nation, Indian Territory open 1887–1906
 Chilocco Indian Agricultural School, Chilocco, Oklahoma, open 1884–1980
 Chinle Boarding School, Many Farms, Arizona
  Choctaw Academy, Blue Spring, Scott County, Kentucky, opened 1825
 Chuala Female Seminary (also known as the Pine Ridge Mission School), near Doaksville, Choctaw Nation, Indian Territory, open 1838–61. by the Presbyterian Church
 Circle of Nations Indian School , Wahpeton, North Dakota
 Colbert Institute, Perryville, Choctaw Nation, Indian Territory, open 1852–57, operated by the Methodist Episcopal Church, South
 Collins Institute, near Stonewall, Chickasaw Nation, Indian Territory, open about 1885 to 1905
 Concho Indian Boarding School, Concho, Oklahoma open 1909–83
 Creek Orphan Asylum, Okmulgee, Creek Nation, Indian Territory, opened 1895
 Darlington Mission School, Darlington, Indian Territory run by the General Conference Mennonites from 1881 to 1902
 Dwight Mission, Marble City, Oklahoma
 Elliott Academy (formerly Oak Hill Industrial Academy), near Valliant, Oklahoma, open 1912–36
 El Meta Bond College, Minco, Chickasaw Nation, Indian Territory, open 1890–1919.
 Emahaka Mission, Wewoka, Seminole Nation, Indian Territory open 1894–1911
 Euchee Boarding School, Sapulpa, Creek Nation, Indian Territory open 1894–1947
 Eufaula Dormitory, Eufaula, Oklahoma name changed from Eufaula High School in 1952. Still in operation 
 Eufaula Indian High School, Eufaula, Creek Nation, Indian Territory replaced the burned Asbury Manual Labor School. Open in 1892–1952, when the name changed to Eufaula Dormitory
 Flandreau Indian School, South Dakota
 Folsom Training School, near Smithville, Oklahoma open 1921–32, when it became an all-white school
 Fort Bidwell School, Fort Bidwell, California
 Fort Coffee Academy, Fort Coffee, Choctaw Nation, Indian Territory Open 1840–63 and run by the Methodist Episcopal Church, South
 Fort Shaw Indian School, Fort Shaw, Montana
 Fort Sill Indian School (originally known as Josiah Missionary School), near Fort Sill, Indian Territory opened in 1871 by the Quakers, remained open until 1980
Fort Totten Indian Industrial School, Fort Totten, North Dakota. Boarding and Indian Industrial School in 1891–1935.  Became a Community and Day School from 1940 to 1959.  Now a Historic Site run by the State Historic Society of North Dakota.
 Genoa Indian Industrial School, Genoa, Nebraska
 Goodland Academy & Indian Orphanage, Hugo, Oklahoma
 Greenville School, California
 Hampton Institute, began accepting Native students in 1878
 Harley Institute, near Tishomingo, Chickasaw Nation, Oklahoma, Prior to it was known as the Chickasaw Academy. Operated 1889–1906 by the Methodist Episcopal Church until 1906.
 Haskell Indian Industrial Training School, Lawrence, Kansas, 1884–present
 Hayward Indian School, Hayward, Wisconsin
 Hillside Mission School, near Skiatook, Cherokee Nation, Indian Territory open 1884–1908, operated by the Quakers
 Holbrook Indian School, Holbrook, Arizona
 Ignacio Boarding School, Colorado
 Iowa Mission School, near Fallis, Iowa Reservation, Indian Territory open 1890–93 by the Quakers
 Intermountain Indian School, Utah
 Jones Academy, Hartshorne, Choctaw Nation, Indian Territory/Oklahoma Opened in 1891
 Koweta Mission School Coweta, Creek Nation, Indian Territory open 1843–61
 Levering Manual Labor School, Wetumka, Creek Nation, Indian Territory Open 1882–91, operated by the Southern Baptist Convention.
 Many Farms High School, near Many Farms, Arizona
 Martinsburg Indian School, Martinsburg, Pennsylvania 1885–1888
 Marty Indian School, Marty, South Dakota
 Mary Immaculate School, DeSmet, Idaho 1878–1974
 Mekasukey Academy, near Seminole, Seminole Nation, Indian Territory open 1891–1930
 Morris Industrial School for Indians, Morris, Minnesota, open 1887–1909
 Mount Edgecumbe High School, Sitka, Alaska, established as a BIA school, now operated by the State of Alaska
 Mount Pleasant Indian Industrial Boarding School, Mount Pleasant, Michigan, 1893–1934
 Murray State School of Agriculture, Tishomingo, Oklahoma, est. 1908
 Nenannezed Boarding School, New Mexico
 New Hope Academy, Fort Coffee, Choctaw Nation, Indian Territory Open 1844–96 and run by the Methodist Episcopal Church, South
 Nuyaka School and Orphanage (Nuyaka Mission, Presbyterian), Okmulgee, Creek Nation, Indian Territory, 1884–1933
 Oak Hill Industrial Academy, near Valliant, Choctaw Nation, Indian Territory Open 1878–1912 by the Presbyterian Mission Board. The Choctaw freedmen's academy was renamed as the Elliott Academy (aka Alice Lee Elliott Memorial Academy) in 1912.
 Oak Ridge Manual Labor School, near Holdenville, Indian Territory in the Seminole Nation. Open 1848–60s by the Presbyterian Mission Board.
 Oklahoma Presbyterian College for Girls, Durant, Oklahoma
 Oklahoma School for the Blind, Muskogee, Oklahoma
 Oklahoma School for the Deaf, Sulphur, Oklahoma
 Oneida Indian School, Wisconsin
 Osage Boarding School, Pawhuska, Osage Nation, Indian Territory open 1874–1922
 Panguitch Boarding School, Panguitch, Utah
 Park Hill Mission School, Park Hill Indian Territory/Oklahoma opened 1837
 Pawnee Boarding School, Pawnee, Indian Territory, open 1878–1958
 Phoenix Indian School, Phoenix, Arizona
 Pierre Indian School, Pierre, South Dakota
 Red Cloud Indian School [formerly Holy Rosary Mission], Pine Ridge, South Dakota
 Pine Ridge Mission School, near Doaksville, Choctaw Nation, Indian Territory see Chuala Female Seminary
 Pinon Boarding School, Pinon, Arizona
 Pipestone Indian School, Pipestone, Minnesota
 Quapaw Industrial Boarding School, Quapaw Agency Indian Territory open 1872–1900
 Rainy Mountain Boarding School, near Gotebo, Kiowa-Comanche-Apache Reservation, Indian Territory, open 1893–1920
 Rapid City Indian School, Rapid City, South Dakota
 Red Moon School, near Hammon, Indian Territory open 1897–1922
 Rehoboth Mission School located in Rehoboth, New Mexico near Navajo Nation. Operated as an Indian Boarding School by the Christian Reformed Church in North America from 1903 to the 1990s. 
 Riverside Indian School, Anadarko, Oklahoma open 1871–present
 Sac and Fox Boarding School, near Stroud, Indian Territory, open 1872–1919 by the Quakers
 Sacred Heart College, near Asher, Potowatamie Nation, Indian Territory open 1884–1902
 Sacred Heart Institute, near Asher, Potowatamie Nation, Indian Territory open 1880–1929
 St. Agnes Academy, Ardmore, Oklahoma
 St. Agnes Mission, Antlers, Oklahoma
 St. Boniface Indian School, Banning, California
 St. Elizabeth's Boarding School, Purcell, Oklahoma
 St. John's Boarding School, Gray Horse, Osage Nation, Indian Territory open 1888–1913  and operated by the Bureau of Catholic Indian Missions
 St. Joseph's Boarding School, Chickasha, Oklahoma
 St. Joseph's Indian School, Chamberlain, South Dakota
 St. Mary's Academy, near Asher, Potowatamie Nation, Indian Territory open 1880–1946
 St. Louis Industrial School, Pawhuska, Osage Nation, Indian Territory open 1887–1949 and operated by the Bureau of Catholic Indian Missions
 St. Mary's Boarding School, Quapaw Agency Indian Territory/Oklahoma open 1893–1927
 St. Patrick's Mission and Boarding School, Anadarko, Indian Territory open 1892–1909 by the Bureau of Catholic Indian Missions. It was rebuilt and called the Anadarko Boarding School.
 San Juan Boarding School, New Mexico 
 Santa Fe Indian School, Santa Fe, New Mexico
 Sasakwa Female Academy, Sasakwa, Seminole Nation, Indian Territory open 1880–92 and run by the Methodist Episcopal Church, South
 Seger Indian Training School, Colony, Indian Territory
 Seneca, Shawnee, and Wyandotte Industrial Boarding School, Wyandotte, Indian Territory
 Sequoyah High School, Tahlequah, Cherokee Nation, Indian Territory
 Shawnee Boarding School, near Shawnee, Indian Territory, open 1876–1918
 Shawnee Boarding School, Shawnee, Oklahoma open 1923–61
 Sherman Indian High School, Riverside, California
 Shiprock Boarding School, Shiprock, New Mexico
 Southwestern Indian Polytechnic Institute, Albuquerque, New Mexico
 Spencer Academy (sometimes referred to as the National School of the Choctaw Nation), near Doaksville, Choctaw Nation, Indian Territory open 1842–1900
 Springfield Indian School, Springfield, South Dakota
 Stewart Indian School, Carson City, Nevada
 Sulphur Springs Indian School, Pontotoc County, Chickasaw Nation, Indian Territory open 1896–98
  Theodore Roosevelt Indian Boarding School, founded in 1923 in buildings of the U.S. Army's closed Fort Apache, Arizona, as of 2016 still in operation as a tribal school
 Thomas Indian School, near Irving, New York
 Tomah Indian School, Wisconsin
 Tullahassee Mission School, Tullahassee, Creek Nation, Indian Territory opened 1850 burned 1880
 Tullahassee Manual Labor School, Tullahassee, Creek Nation, Indian Territory open 1883–1914 for Creek Freedmen
 Tushka Lusa Institute (later called Tuska Lusa or Tushkaloosa Academy), near Talihina, Choctaw Nation, Indian Territory opened 1892 for Choctaw Freedmen
 Tuskahoma Female Academy, Lyceum, Choctaw Nation, Indian Territory open 1892–1925
 Wahpeton Indian School, Wahpeton, North Dakota, 1904–93. In 1993 its name was changed to Circle of Nations School and came under tribal control. Currently open.
 Wapanucka Academy (also sometimes called Allen Academy), near Bromide, Chickasaw Nation, Indian Territory Open 1851–1911 by the Presbyterian Church.
 Wealaka Mission School Wealaka, Indian Territory open 1882–1907
 Wetumka Boarding School, Wetumka, Creek Nation, Indian Territory, opened as Israel G. Vore and Levering Manual Labor School transferred from the Baptists to the Muscogee (Creek) Nation in 1891 and they changed the name to the Wetumka Boarding School. Operated until 1910.
 Wewoka Mission School, (also known as Ramsey Mission School) near Wewoka, Seminole Nation, Indian Territory Open 1868–80 by the Presbyterian Mission Board.  
 Wheelock Academy, Millerton, Oklahoma closed 1955
 White's Manual Labor Institute, Wabash, Indiana Open 1870–95 and operated by the Quakers
 White's Manual Labor Institute, West Branch, Iowa, open 1881–87
 Wittenberg Indian School, Wittenberg, Wisconsin
 Yellow Springs School, Pontotoc County, Chickasaw Nation, Indian Territory open 1896–1905

References

 
Lists of schools in the United States
Boarding schools
Lists of boarding schools